Amy Webster (born March 3, 1969) is a former American ice dancer. Webster began her skating career in Yarmouth, Maine. With partner Ron Kravette, she won the bronze medal at the United States Figure Skating Championships in 1994 and 1995, and finished fourth in 1993 and 1997. Webster and Kravette won the gold medal at the 1993 United States Olympic Festival in San Antonio, and were the alternate pair for the 1994 Winter Olympics in Lillehammer. She turned professional in July 1997 and later appeared in Champions on Ice events.

Competitive highlights 
GP: Champions Series (Grand Prix)

With Kravette

With Erickson

With Millier

References

American female ice dancers
1969 births
Living people
21st-century American women